Xhemaili is a surname. Notable people with the surname include:

 Faton Xhemaili (born 1998), Serbian-born Albanian footballer
 Mirvan Xhemaili (born 1974), Macedonian politician
 Riola Xhemaili (born 2003), Swiss footballer